CFU-GM, also known as granulocyte–macrophage progenitor (GMP), is a colony forming unit. It is derived from CFU-GEMM.

The "GM" stands for "granulocyte, monocyte".

It is the precursor for monoblasts and myeloblasts.

Production is stimulated by granulocyte macrophage colony-stimulating factor (GM-CSF).

Granulocytes
There is some controversy over which granulocytes derive from CFU-GM.

 There is little disagreement that neutrophils come from CFU-GM.
 Some sources state that basophils also derive from CFU-GM, but that eosinophils come from "CFU-Eos".
 Other sources state that basophils do not derive from CFU-GM, but from a distinct CFU, titled "CFU-Baso".

See also
 Hematopoietic stem cell § Nomenclature of hematopoietic colonies and lineages

References

External links
 

Colony forming units
Hematopoietic stem cells
Blood cells